Storm Hunter (née Sanders; born 11 August 1994) is an Australian professional tennis player. She reached a career-high singles ranking of world No. 119, on 18 October 2021, and a career-high doubles ranking of world No. 8, on 24 October 2022.

Hunter won her first Grand Slam title in mixed doubles at 2022 US Open. She has also won five doubles titles on the WTA Tour as well as two singles titles and 13 doubles titles on the ITF Women's Circuit.

Hunter debuted on the ITF Junior Circuit in December 2007, and on the senior circuit in November 2008. She won her first professional tournament in February 2013.

She also represented Australia at the 2020 Summer Olympics, which due to the COVID-19 pandemic were held in 2021, reaching the quarterfinals in the women's doubles competition.

Early life
Hunter was born in Rockhampton, where she began playing tennis at the age of six after watching the Australian Open on television. Her father signed her up with a local tennis club where she was coached by Robert Beak. Her development initially progressed slowly and in Beak's words "wasn't the most talented" despite her strong work ethic and determination. However, according to Beak, Hunter's skills underwent a sudden and rapid improvement after "something clicked".

Beak coached Hunter until she relocated to Perth with her parents in 2005. Hunter continued playing tennis and returned to Queensland the following year to represent Western Australia in the Bruce Cup in Mackay in August 2006 and to compete in the Head Queensland State Age Championships in Rockhampton in September 2006.

Hunter graduated from the School of Isolated and Distance Education in Western Australia in 2011, after which she received a Melbourne-based tennis scholarship. In 2013, Hunter began attending the University of Canberra where she studied a Bachelor of Science in Psychology degree.

Storm's parents and younger brother all serve in the Australian Defence Force.

Professional career

2013
Hunter began her year ranked 674 in the world. Her first tournament was the Sydney International, where she received a wildcard into qualifying. She stunned Eugenie Bouchard in the first round in two tiebreak sets, but lost in the second round against Misaki Doi. She then received a wildcard into qualifying at the Australian Open where she lost in the first round against Yuliya Beygelzimer. In February, after failing to qualify for the Burnie International, Hunter celebrated a breakthrough victory, winning the $25k Launceston Tennis International tournament. She won through both, the qualifying and main draws, without dropping a set. She also achieved the rare feat of defeating the top seeds in both the qualifying draw (Mari Tanaka) and the main draw (Olivia Rogowska) en route to victory. She reached the top 500 in the WTA rankings for the first time after the tournament win. A month later, she reached the final of the $25k event in Ipswich, Queensland, losing to Jelena Pandžić in three sets.

In July, together with her British partner Naomi Broady, Hunter won the $50k Gold River Challenger, defeating Robin Anderson and Lauren Embree, in straight sets.

In the US Open qualifying, she lost in the first round to Nigina Abduraimova from Uzbekistan.

2014
Hunter began the season at the Brisbane International, having received a wildcard into qualifying. She opened with a three-set win over Irina-Camelia Begu. Although taking the opening set, Hunter lost against third seed Hsieh Su-wei in the second round, in three sets.

The following week, she was awarded a wildcard to the main draw of the Hobart International. A first-round win over Peng Shuai saw her match up with second seed Kirsten Flipkens. Pushing the top-20 ranked Belgian to the brink, Hunter lost in a tough three-set match, lasting over two and a half hours. Despite the close loss, it was announced that She had been given a wildcard into the singles main draw of the Australian Open, having been given wildcards for the doubles draw the previous two years. She played Camila Giorgi in round one, losing on her Grand Slam singles debut, in three sets. She also lost in the first round of women's and mixed doubles.

2015
Given a wildcard for the Hobart International, Hunter lost in round one to Camila Giorgi, in three sets. She was then given a wildcard for the Australian Open, but lost at the first stage again, this time to world No. 46, Klára Koukalová, in straight sets.

2016
In July, she qualified for the Jiangxi International - the first time Hunter has come through qualifying at a WTA-level event. She lost to Vania King in the first round. In October, she reached the second round of the Toowoomba ITF event. In November, She won the ITF Canberra doubles title with Jessica Moore.

2017: First WTA Tour doubles title
She attempted to qualify for the Hobart International and Australian Open, losing in the first round. Her best singles performance was a quarterfinal appearance in September at the ITF Brisbane.

In doubles, Hunter won the Nottingham Open, with Monique Adamczak in June. It was their first WTA Tour title. She made two further WTA tournament finals that year.

2018–2020
Hunter played four doubles tournaments in 2018, losing all four in the first round. 
In 2019, she said "I started getting some shoulder pain which got more intense. I played the Aussie Open that year just focusing on doubles, but after that I stopped played completely and was basically out for all of 2018."

Hunter returned to singles competition in October 2019, after almost a two-year absence. She won the Playford International in her second tournament back.
In doubles, she won four ITF doubles titles in 2019.

She won her second WTA doubles title at the 2020 Thailand Open.

2021: WTA quarterfinals, Major semifinal, top 200
Hunter made the semifinals in mixed doubles at the Australian Open with Marc Polmans.

In February, she qualified for and defeated four higher-ranked opponents to advance to her first WTA-level singles quarterfinal at the Adelaide International, eventually losing to Belinda Bencic. In March, Hunter entered the WTA top 200 for the first time.

In May, she qualified for a Grand Slam tournament in singles for the first time at the French Open.

In June at Wimbledon, she reached the semifinals in women's doubles with Caroline Dolehide.

In July, Hunter reached her second WTA-level quarterfinal at the Prague Open. She also reached the semifinals in doubles at the same event. At the Tokyo Olympics, Hunter partnered Ashleigh Barty in the ladies' doubles and they reached the quarterfinals.

In November, Hunter represented Australia at the BJK Cup Finals. She recorded the biggest win of her singles career, beating world No. 18, Belgian Elise Mertens, in her BJK Cup debut. She then defeated Belarusian Yuliya Hatouka promoting Australia to the semifinals where she lost to Swiss Jil Teichmann.

2022: First WTA 1000 & 500 titles, US Open SF & mixed doubles title, world No. 8
In January 2022, Hunter won her third and the biggest WTA Tour title, at the Adelaide International, alongside Ashleigh Barty.

In September, Hunter reached the semifinals in doubles at the US Open with Caroline Dolehide. At the same tournament, she teamed up with John Peers to win the mixed doubles title defeating Kirsten Flipkens and Édouard Roger-Vasselin in an epic three set match.

The following month, Hunter won her first WTA 1000 partnering Luisa Stefani at the Guadalajara Open. As a result, she stormed into the top 10 in the doubles rankings at world No. 8 on 24 October 2022.

Personal life
Storm married Loughlin Hunter in November 2022.

Performance timelines
Only main-draw results in WTA Tour, Grand Slam tournaments, Fed Cup/Billie Jean King Cup and Olympic Games are included in win–loss records.

Singles
Current after the 2023 Australian Open.

Doubles
Current after the 2023 Australian Open.

Significant finals

Grand Slam finals

Mixed doubles: 1 (title)

WTA 1000 finals

Doubles: 1 (title)

WTA career finals

Doubles: 11 (5 titles, 6 runner-ups)

ITF Circuit finals

Singles: 5 (3 titles, 2 runner–ups)

Doubles: 22 (13 titles, 9 runner–ups)

Notes

References

External links

 
 
 
 

1994 births
Living people
Sportspeople from Rockhampton
Australian female tennis players
Tennis people from Queensland
Olympic tennis players of Australia
Tennis players at the 2020 Summer Olympics
US Open (tennis) champions
Grand Slam (tennis) champions in mixed doubles
21st-century Australian women